Cox Pavilion is a , multi-purpose indoor arena on the University of Nevada, Las Vegas campus, connected to the Thomas & Mack Center. The Pavilion serves as the home court for UNLV Lady Rebels women's basketball and volleyball programs as well as the annual NBA Summer League.

Cox Communications and UNLV formed a partnership for the new facility in 2001. The arena cost $16.8 million. As part of a $5 million agreement, Cox Communications secured the naming rights for the facility as well as opportunities for sponsorship and hospitality.

The pavilion is a two-level structure. The ground floor features new men's and women's locker facilities, player lounges and practice courts for basketball and volleyball. The top level is a multi-purpose venue with a seating capacity of 2,500 to 3,100 for sporting events.

In addition to UNLV athletic events, the Cox Pavilion hosts a variety of events, including small concerts, boxing events, theater-style family shows, corporate parties, trade shows and more.

On November 15, 2007, the arena hosted the Democratic Presidential Debate for the 2008 presidential election.

See also
 List of NCAA Division I basketball arenas

References

2001 establishments in Nevada
College basketball venues in the United States
College volleyball venues in the United States
Sports venues in Las Vegas
UNLV Lady Rebels basketball venues
Basketball venues in Nevada
Indoor arenas in Las Vegas